The Hairy Bikers' Asian Adventure is a British cookery and travel show presented by The Hairy Bikers, Dave Myers and Simon King. It follows them travelling around Asia trying the local cuisine, meeting local people and cooking some native dishes themselves. The series began airing on 13 February 2014 on BBC Two.

Episodes

Reception
The first episode saw positive UK overnight ratings of 2.33m (10.1% share) beating Channel 4 and Channel 5 in the same slot. Slightly negative comments were made by The Independent, saying 'Si and Dave's antics prove hard to stomach'.

References

External links

2010s British cooking television series
2014 British television series debuts
2014 British television series endings
BBC Television shows
British cooking television shows
English-language television shows